The London and South Western Railway (LSWR) 0298 Class or Beattie Well Tank is a class of British steam locomotive.  They are s, originally built between 1863 and 1875 for use on passenger services in the suburbs of London, but later used on rural services in South West England. Out of a total production of 85, two locomotives have been preserved in an operational condition.

History 

In 1850, the LSWR decided that the London suburban passenger services should be operated using small tank locomotives. To determine the most suitable type, Joseph Hamilton Beattie, the LSWR Mechanical Engineer, prepared a series of designs for six-wheeled well tank locomotives, each of which incorporated one or more differences from the previous class. A small quantity of each was produced: between 1852 and 1859, 26 were built, to six different designs. These were the Tartar and Sussex classes of 1852, the Chaplin and Minerva classes of 1856, the Nelson class of 1858 and the Nile class of 1859.

The new design eventually totalled 85 locomotives; most came from the Manchester firm of Beyer, Peacock and Company between 1863 and 1875, but three were built in the LSWR workshops at Nine Elms during 1872. Their numbers were 33, 34, 36, 44, 76, 177–220, 243–270, 298, 299, 314 and 325–329.

The locomotives were built as follows:

The locomotives delivered in February 1863 were the first locomotives on the LSWR not to be given names. Five of the later locomotives were named: 33 Phœnix; 34 Osprey; 36 Comet; 44 Pluto; 76 Firefly; these names were generally taken from older locomotives which had carried the same numbers.

In a well tank locomotive, the water tanks are not mounted above the footplate, but are set low down. On these locomotives, there were two tanks, both between the frames: one was above the leading axle, the other beneath the cab footplate. These resembled side tanks, but carried no water—this feature was introduced by J.H. Beattie's son and successor, William George Beattie, who had taken office on 23 November 1871 after his father's death on 18 October.

They handled heavy loads with ease, and were fast runners. From 1890, when newer locomotives became available for the London suburban services, the Beattie  were sent to depots outside the London area. Some of their new duties required a greater water capacity than the tanks could contain, and so 31 were converted to tender engines between 1883 and 1887; these were withdrawn between 1888 and 1898. Three of these, nos. 44, 257 and 266 (the latter two having by then been renumbered 0257 and 0266), were also withdrawn between 1896 and 1898. The other three locomotives (298, 314 and 329) were transferred to the Bodmin and Wadebridge Railway in 1895, which was one of the earliest railways in Cornwall and isolated from the main LSWR network until that year. These three remained in service because of the sharp curves of that railway's freight branch to Wenford Bridge, which carried China clay traffic to the main line. They were finally withdrawn in 1962 and replaced by GWR 1366 Class 0-6-0PT dock tanks. In 1958, they were noted as "the oldest design still in use on British Railways (although not quite the oldest engines ...)", the latter distinction being given to Nos. 32636 and 32670 of the former LB&SCR A1X class, which had been built in 1872.

Renumbering
When the locomotives became old, their numbers were altered in order to release numbers for newer locomotives being built as replacements. The process was known as a transfer to the "duplicate list", and the existing number could be altered in any of four ways: addition of zero prefix; being crossed out; being underlined; being given a  line or dot beneath the number. These methods were equivalent, and some locos had the numbers altered in one way on the cab side, and in a different way in the record books. Thus, no. 298 became no. 0298.

Not every loco was transferred to the duplicate list - several were withdrawn whilst carrying their original numbers. Most were transferred between 1888 and 1894, but the three retained for the Bodmin and Wadebridge Railway were not given duplicate numbers until later on. The renumberings of these final three were as follows:

The first SR number was simply the final LSWR number prefixed with "E", to denote Eastleigh Works.

Preservation 

Two of the locomotives have survived and are preserved. Number 298 (later renumbered 30587) is owned by the National Railway Museum (NRM) and is loaned to, and normally based at, the Bodmin and Wenford Railway, however it was at the NRM for six months (from July 2018 until January 2019) hauling brake-van rides in the South Yard. Number 314 (30585) is owned by the Quainton Railway Society and normally based at their Buckinghamshire Railway Centre. 

In October 2010, 30585 was on short-term loan to the Bodmin and Wenford Railway. Both preserved engines were in steam and operating trains together on parts of the routes they would have served between 1895 and 1962.

Models
Dapol originally manufactured a model of the 0298 in OO gauge for sale exclusively by Kernow Model Rail Centre. It is now marketed by many other retailers by Bachmann under the EFE brand. The new models under the brand were confirmed in November 2020.

References

Bibliography

External links

 Southern e-group page

2-4-0WT locomotives
298
Railway locomotives introduced in 1863
Beyer, Peacock locomotives
Well tank locomotives
Standard gauge steam locomotives of Great Britain
Passenger locomotives